Charles Boateng (born 28 July 1997) is a Ghanaian professional footballer who plays as a forward for USL League One club Richmond Kickers, on loan from WAFA SC.

In January 2017, Boateng agreed to terms with Real Salt Lake to join their USL side Real Monarchs on loan. However, in February it was announced by the club that Boateng had failed his physical and would not be joining the side.

In March 2019, Boateng made his return to the US after signing on loan with the Richmond Kickers.

In the first round of the 2019 U.S. Open Cup, Boateng scored four goals to lead the Kickers to a 6–2 win over Virginia United.

Boateng finished the 2019 season by scoring two goals in the final three league matches against the Chattanooga Red Wolves on September 29, 2019, as well as in a 2–0 win over Orlando City B in the final match of the season.

References

External links
 

1997 births
Living people
Ghanaian footballers
Ghanaian expatriate footballers
Association football forwards
Richmond Kickers players
USL League One players